Elect-Sport FC is a football (soccer) club from Chad based in N'Djamena. It plays its home matches on Stade Omnisports Idriss Mahamat Ouya in N'Djamena.

The club's colours are traditionally yellow and black.

History

The club has won national championship 6 times; in 1988, 1990, 1992, 2008, 2018 and 2019. The club has also won Coupe de Ligue de N'Djaména 2 times, in 2012  and 2014. In 2015 the club was among the entrants to preliminary round of CAF Confederation Cup where they played against Libyan Al-Ittihad Tripoli. In the first match in Libya, Al-Ittihad won 6–1. In the return leg in N'Djamena Al-Ittihad won 1–0 and ruled out Elect from the competition.

Stadium

Stade Omnisports Idriss Mahamat Ouya, also named Stade Nacional, is a multi-purpose stadium located in N'Djamena, Chad.  It is currently used mostly for football matches.  The stadium holds 20,000 people. It is currently the home ground of the Chad national football team. It is named after former Chadian highjumper Mahamat Idriss (1942—1987).

Achievements
Chad Premier League : 6
 1988, 1990, 1992, 2008, 2018, 2019.

Chad Cup: 0
 Runners-up: 1993.

Coupe de Ligue de N'Djaména: 2
 2012, 2014.

Chad Super Cup: 0
 Runners-up: 2008.

Performance in CAF competitions
CAF Champions League: 3 appearances
2009 – Preliminary Round
2018 – Preliminary Round
2020 – First Round

African Cup of Champions Clubs: 2 appearances
1991 – First Round
1993 – Preliminary Round

CAF Confederation Cup: 3 appearances
2013 – Preliminary Round
2015 – Preliminary Round
2020 – Play-off Round

CAF Cup: 1 appearance
1994 – withdrew in First Round

Current Players

Managers

2010-2011 – Mahamat Abakar
2012 – Amane Tounia
2013 – Maslengar Djikoloum
2014–2015 – Toukam Julien
2016 - Amane Adoum
2018 - today  – Francis Oumar Belonga

References

External links
Gazelle FC VS Elect-Sport FC/Ligue de N'djamena

Football clubs in Chad
N'Djamena
Works association football teams